Dez may refer to:
Dez (tribe), also spelled Diz, one of the Assyrian tribes of Hakkari

People

Music
 Dez Cadena (born 1961), American punk rock singer and guitarist
 Dez Dickerson (born 1955), American guitarist and singer, member of Prince's band The Revolution
 Dez Fafara (born 1966), American singer
 Dez Nado (born 1989), American hip hop and reggae singer, songwriter, record producer, and television producer

Sports
 Desmond Dez Bryant (born 1988), American National Football League wide receiver
 Dez Stewart (born 1993), American football wide receiver
 Edward Dezmon Dez White (born 1979), American National Football League wide receiver
 Dezmon Dez Giraldi (born 1986), Australian footballer
 Dez Wells (born 1992), American pro basketball player

Other
 Derek Dez Skinn (born 1951), British comic, magazine editor and author

Fictional characters
 Dez Wade, from the American television series Austin & Ally

See also
Des, a given name

Hypocorisms